Events from the year 1858 in Russia

Incumbents
 Monarch – Alexander II

Events

 Bolhrad High School
 Gorky Library (Ryazan)
 Kiev Police
 K. Rudzki i S-ka
 Vodka protests of 1858–1859

Births

Deaths

References

1858 in Russia
Years of the 19th century in the Russian Empire